was a JR East railway station located in Minamisanriku, Miyagi Prefecture, Japan. The station was destroyed by the 2011 Tōhoku earthquake and tsunami. Services have now been replaced by a provisional bus rapid transit line.

Lines
Shizugawa Station was served by the Kesennuma Line, and was located 33.7 rail kilometers from the terminus of the line at Maeyachi Station.

Station layout
Shizugawa Station had a single side platform and a single island platform serving two tracks, and connected to the station building by a level crossing.

History
Shizugawa Station opened on 11 December 1977. The station was absorbed into the JR East network upon the privatization of the Japan National Railways (JNR) on April 1, 1987. Operations were discontinued after the station was completely destroyed by the 2011 Tōhoku earthquake and tsunami and an iconic video on the internet recorded from the Shizugawa High School shows the station being flattened as well as the tracks and other nearby buildings before being pouring down to a flat area towards a neighborhood. Today rail services have now been replaced by a bus rapid transit line.

Surrounding area
Japan National Route 45
former Shizugawa Town Hall
Sode Beach Ocean Swimming Area

References

External links

 JR East Station information 
  video of a train trip from Utatsu Station to Shizugawa Station in 2009, passing Shizuhama Station at around 03:45 minutes without stopping.  Satellite photos (e.g., in Google Maps) showed that much of the landscape visible in the video was severely affected by the 2011 tsunami and most of the railway bridges the train travels across were partly or completely destroyed.  The destination Shizugawa Station was completely obliterated.
  video of a train trip from Shizugawa Station to Rikuzen-Yokoyama Station in 2009, passing Rikuzen-Togura Station at around 03:48 minutes without stopping.  Satellite photos (e.g., in Google Maps) showed that some sections of the railway were completely washed away by the 2011 tsunami, particularly near the departure point of Shizugawa Station and the vicinity of Rikuzen-Togura Station, while other sections remained intact.
 video shot from a train (facing east) in 2009, stopping at Shizugawa Station and then proceeding to Rikuzen-Togura Station on the Kesennuma Line.  Satellite photos (e.g., in Google Maps) and aftermath videos show that virtually every building visible (except the very largest white buildings in the background) in the first three minutes, and in the final minute, were washed away in the 2011 tsunami, as well as the train track and infrastructure and both stations; buildings and track in the middle part were undamaged.  
  Shizugawa Station after the tsunami

Railway stations in Miyagi Prefecture
Kesennuma Line
Railway stations in Japan opened in 1977
Railway stations closed in 2011